Gheorghe Stoiciu (born 3 September 1943) is a Romanian former wrestler who competed in the 1968 Summer Olympics and in the 1972 Summer Olympics.

References

External links
 

1943 births
Living people
Olympic wrestlers of Romania
Wrestlers at the 1968 Summer Olympics
Wrestlers at the 1972 Summer Olympics
Romanian male sport wrestlers
World Wrestling Championships medalists

de:Ion Păun